Symphony No. 5 "Requiem, Bardo, Nirmanakaya" is a symphony for chorus and orchestra by the American composer Philip Glass.  It was commissioned by the Salzburg Festival, Austria and premiered August 28, 1999 and was conducted by Dennis Russell Davies.

Structure
The symphony has a duration of roughly an hour and forty minutes is divided into twelve movements:

Instrumentation
The symphony is scored for solo soprano, mezzo-soprano, tenor, baritone, and bass-baritone, a children's chorus, SATB choir, and a large orchestra consisting of piccolo, two flutes, two oboes, two clarinets, E-flat clarinet, bass clarinet, two bassoons, four horns, three trumpets, two trombones, bass trombone, tuba, timpani, percussion, harp, piano, and strings.

Reception
Reviewing the United States premiere, Paul Griffiths of The New York Times criticized the work's repetition, writing, "Given that the symphony, in 12 movements, summarized the entirety of creation and human life, the homogeneity that was also found in the musical invention was perplexing. 'Dedication of Merit' -- the last movement, a Buddhist prayer for peace to emanate from virtue -- did not sound so different from 'The Creation of Sentient Beings' (the fourth movement) or, indeed, from most of the rest."  He nevertheless added, "But none of these was the moment that counted. What mattered was that right at the end, with an emphatic conclusion in sight, Mr. Glass drew back, took his music into darker, more chromatic territory, had his choir re-enter in moaning disconsolateness, and only then moved toward his close. Irony is not his strong point, but here it seemed that he was, within his own work, undercutting its preposterous pretensions."

References 

 05
Philip Glass albums
Glass 05
Glass 05
1999 compositions